Andrew Baird (born 18 March 1976 in Dublin) is an Irish art director, commercial director, music video director and film director. His feature film debut was Zone 414 (2021), a neo-noir-style science fiction thriller starring Guy Pearce.

Career

Education 
From 1993 to 1997, he studied at the National Film School of Ireland at the Dún Laoghaire Institute of Art, Design and Technology. In 1997, he graduated with Honours with a Bachelor's in Design, Film Direction, and Production Design. In 2001, he earned a Bachelor of Fine Arts from the Screen Director's Guild of Ireland. In 2008, he earned a Bachelor's (with Honours) in production design from the Art Director's Guild.

Professional experience 
His first professional experience was as an art director. Next, he did direction for projects by producer Roger Corman in  Ireland and Eastern Europe. In 2006, he moved to Los Angeles  where he worked as a production designer on commercials and music videos. He did a music film for pop singer The Weeknd entitled Kiss Land from the albums XO. 

His feature film debut was Zone 414, a neo-noir-style science fiction thriller starring Guy Pearce as a hardboiled detective who pairs up with a prostitute android (played by Matilda Lutz) to find a missing woman. His next film is an action thriller entitled One Way.

Art director roles
2015: Fire Meet Gasoline

Production design roles
2014: Acid Girls
2010: The Portal

References

Irish film directors
Irish music video directors
Living people
21st-century Irish people
People from Dublin (city)
1976 births